La Côte is part of the sloping Lake Geneva north shore, stretching from Nyon to Lausanne in the canton of Vaud in Switzerland.

Known for its vineyards, the area has views towards the high Alps across the lake.

Communes
Mies
Coppet
Founex
Prangins
Gland
Gilly
Luins
Vinzel
Bursins
Tartegnin
Rolle
Mont-sur-Rolle
Bougy-Villars
Perroy
Allaman
Aubonne
Etoy
Saint-Prex
Morges
Préverenges
Saint-Sulpice

See also 
 La Côte Airport

Geography of the canton of Vaud
Geography of Switzerland